Cindy Montañez (born January 19, 1974) is a former Democratic Assemblywoman from California's 39th State Assembly district serving for four years, from 2002 until 2006.

Family
Montañez was raised in the city of San Fernando, California along with her five siblings by parents who were immigrants from Mexico.

Early political career
Montañez attended the University of California, Los Angeles. In the Spring of 1993 she was one of five students to join a hunger strike in protest against a decision by UCLA Chancellor Charles E. Young against the creation of a Chicano Studies program on campus. The hunger strike ended after 14 days with the creation of the César E. Chávez Center for Interdisciplinary Instruction in Chicana and Chicano Studies at UCLA. The center later became known as the César E. Chávez Department of Chicana and Chicano Studies.

In 1999 Montañez was elected to the San Fernando City Council, and in 2001 she and her older sister, Maribel de la Torre, made history as two sisters concurrently serving on the same city council when de la Torre won a seat. Montañez resigned from the San Fernando City Council in late 2002 when she won a seat in the California State Assembly, and de la Torre was recalled in 2012 amid a sex scandal.

Assembly tenure
In February 2004, Montañez was named the chairperson of the Assembly Rules Committee. At 30 years old, she was the youngest person to ever chair the powerful committee as well as the first Latina and the first Democratic woman to chair the committee.

Her legislative work focused on issues that were vital to her district. Specific focuses included education, the environment, health care and consumer/worker protection. During her first term, ten of her bills made it out of the legislature and were signed into law. These bills included statutes to improve the management of urban landfills, a law to protect children from a sexually abusive parent and laws to insure the safety of workers. Montanez was the author of the landmark "Car Buyer's Bill of Rights".

Los Angeles City Council races, 2013 and 2015
Montañez was a candidate in a 2013 special election for the 6th District seat on the Los Angeles City Council, which comprises the neighborhoods of Lake Balboa, Van Nuys, Panorama City, Arleta, Sun Valley and segments of North Hills and North Hollywood. The seat became vacant when Tony Cárdenas was elected to the United States House of Representatives. She lost the run-off election on July 23, 2013 to Nury Martinez by a 45%-55% margin. Martinez had served as Montañez's campaign manager when Montañez first ran for the State Assembly in 2002.

Montañez tried to challenge Martinez in a rematch for the full term on March 3, 2015. Montañez lost the election by a margin of 39% to 61%.

Other ventures
In 2006 Montañez stepped down from the Assembly to run for the 20th district state Senate seat. However, she lost that primary to Los Angeles City Councilman Alex Padilla. After leaving the Assembly, Montañez was appointed to the California Unemployment Insurance Appeals Board and the Los Angeles Department of Water and Power.  On July 1, 2014, she resigned from her position as an Assistant General Manager for the Los Angeles Department of Water and Power to run for the Los Angeles City Council.

In March 2016 Montañez was chosen to be the CEO of the environmental advocacy organization; TreePeople, which is located in Los Angeles at Coldwater Canyon City Park in the eastern Santa Monica Mountains.

References

External links
Biography

1974 births
American people of Mexican descent
American politicians of Mexican descent
Living people
Members of the California State Assembly
Women state legislators in California
Hispanic and Latino American state legislators in California
Hispanic and Latino American women in politics
21st-century American politicians
21st-century American women politicians